The 2007 Armenian Premier League season is the sixteenth since its establishment, and started on 14 April 2007. The last matches were played on 10 November 2007. FC Pyunik were the defending champions.

Participating teams

Lernayin Artsakh are promoted.
FC Mika are relocated from Ashtarak to Yerevan.

League table

Results

First half of season

Second half of season

Top goalscorers

See also
 2007 Armenian First League
 2007 Armenian Cup

External links
 FFA: Armenian Premier League 2007
 RSSSF: Armenia 2007 - Premier League

Armenian Premier League seasons
1
Armenia
Armenia